DODGE (Department of Defense Gravity Experiment) was a satellite whose primary purpose was to conduct experiments in gravity-gradient stabilization at near-geosynchronous altitudes. Its secondary objectives included measuring the Earth's magnetic field, and taking pictures of the entire Earth's disk in both black-and-white and color.  It was launched atop a Titan IIIC rocket on July 1, 1967, and operated for over three years.  DODGE carried ten knobbed booms oriented along three different axes, that could be independently extended and retracted by ground command.

DODGE first achieved successful stabilization 12 days after launch. It took in 1967 color-filtered black-and-white images, which put together produced the very first color image of the full-disk Earth (ATS-3 often also cited, produced the first non-black-and-white filtered "true-color" image).

See also 
ATS-3, another satellite also to take one of the first full-disk color pictures of the Earth
First images of Earth from space

References

See also 
 Department of Defense

United States Department of Defense
NASA satellites
Spacecraft launched in 1967
Earth observation satellites of the United States